Tugomir Marko Alaupović (Dolac, Travnik, 18 August 1870 – Zagreb, 9 April 1958) was a Yugoslav professor at "First Grammar School ,Sarajevo, poet, storyteller and politician. In addition to his rich political biography, he was also minister of religion in the government of the Kingdom of Serbs, Croats and Slovenes. He has written several literary works that have been translated into French, German, Czech and Italian. He was one of the initiators of the Croatian Society for the "Setting up of Children in Crafts and Trade" in Sarajevo and later initiated the change of the society name to Napredak. He was a member of the Main Board of the Serbian St. Sava Society in Belgrade. On 16 January 1934, after a serious operation, in a letter to Tihomir Djordjevic, a prominent Serbian ethnologist, he said:

Early life

Tugomir Alaupovic lost his father early and was raised by his mother, Ivka Abramovic-Klincic. He finished elementary school in Dolac, near Travnik. He attended grammar school in Travnik and Sarajevo. After high school he studied Slavic and classical philology in Zagreb and Vienna .Tugomir Alaupovic, a Slavist , as one of the few with the academic title of Doctor of Science, received his doctorate in 1894 from Vatroslav Jagic   in Vienna. In Vienna, he defended his dissertation of Juraj Barakovic's Vila Slovinka, thus becoming one of the first PhDs in Bosnia.

Career

Tugomir Alaupovic worked as a professor in Sarajevo (1904–1910). In 1910 he became principal of the "Great Gymnasium" in Tuzla. From 1913 to 1915 he was a school counselor and superintendent of secondary schools in Bosnia and Herzegovina. The Austro-Hungarian government who suspiciously observed every act of spiritual and national identity in Bosnia, in Tugomir's work, recognized the alleged treason, then removed him from the education service, and brought him to trial. Due to his Yugoslav orientation, he was under Austro-Hungarian government surveillance in Sarajevo.From mid-1918 until the end of the war in Zagreb, he was Secretary of the Croatian Matica (Croatian: Matica hrvatska). With the establishment of the Kingdom, he became Minister of Religion in the first government of the SXS. In Sarajevo, in the same year, he became a member of the People's Council of the Kingdom of the Serbs, Croats and Slovenes, and by decree the National Government of Bosnia and Herzegovina returned him to his former service in education.

References

Bosnia and Herzegovina educators
1870 births
1958 deaths